The Kulshan caldera is a Pleistocene volcano in the North Cascades of Washington and one of the few calderas identified in the entire Cascade Range. It is the product of the Mount Baker volcanic field, which has a history stretching back to possibly 3.722 million years ago.

Geology

Precaldera activity 
About ten precaldera units have been identified, but none have been attributed to a major edifice like the Mount Baker we see today. Four of the ten units are composed mostly of rhyodacite which is similar in composition to the rhyodacite that was erupted in the climactic eruption. The other six are andesite dikes and scraps of dacite that are outside of the caldera margin; these six are prominent at Barometer Mountain, Slate Mountain, Chowder Ridge, Lake Ann, and Park Glacier. The rhyodacite units can be found at Dobbs Cleaver, Cougar Divide, Deadhorse Creek, and Swift Rainbow divide. Some of these dikes contain pyroclastic material which indicates that explosive activity occurred before the climactic eruption.

Climactic eruption 

Formation of the caldera about 1.149 million years ago was accompanied by the largest eruption in the history of the Mount Baker volcanic field. The eruption was subglacial, blasting upward through the continental ice sheet. Over 124 km3 (29.7 cubic miles) of rhyodacite magma erupted from a shallow magma chamber in an ultra-plinian eruption. The magma in this water/ice interaction was quenched and shattered in phreatomagmatic explosions to produce only small fragments of pumice. As the magma escaped from the shallow reservoir, the rock above it collapsed downward forming a massive 4.5 x 8 km (2.8 x 5 mi) depression. As the eruption progressed, the caldera was filled with up to 1,000 meters (3,280 ft.) of ignimbrite and tephra. While rhyodacite took up the bulk composition of the eruption some andesitic pumice can be sparsely found in the rhyodacite bands. After the eruption, subsequent glacial recession removed most of the tephra fallout near the caldera. Eventually stripping away all remnants of extracaldera ash flows. The eruption that created the caldera was significantly larger in volume than the one that produced Crater Lake in Oregon.

Postcaldera volcanism 
After the climactic eruption between 1.149 and 0.99 million years ago, about a dozen dike-fed eruptions produced rhyodacitic lava domes and lava flows inside the caldera. Another volcanic phase 1.1 to 0.5 million years ago emplaced over 60 andesite dikes, the eruptive products of which have since been stripped away by glacial erosion. It is speculated that the eruptive rocks from this volcanic phase formed one or more large andesitic cone now completely removed.

References

External links

Volcanoes of Washington (state)
Cascade Volcanoes
Calderas of Washington (state)
Pleistocene calderas
North Cascades of Washington (state)
Mount Baker-Snoqualmie National Forest
VEI-7 volcanoes
Subglacial calderas
Mount Baker